The State of Queensland has created several independent honours to that of the Australian Honours System.

Non-service specific State awards

Citations 

Unit citations are awarded to the organisation, and may be worn by members who served in the organisation at the time and meeting the requirements.

 2010-2011 Queensland Flood and Cyclone Citation – Performed duty on at least one shift at any time between 1 December 2010 and 28 February 2011.
 2014 G20 Citation – Introduced to acknowledge Government agencies during the 2014 G20 events held in Brisbane.  The frame has 'G20' at the top and '2014' at the bottom.  Ribbon colours of green, blue and orange are from the summit's logo.  
 2018 Commonwealth Games Citation - Introduced to acknowledge Government agencies during the 2018 Gold Coast Commonwealth Games. The frame has 'XXI COMMONWEALTH GAMES' at the top and '2018' at the bottom, with the ribbon representing the surf (blue), sand (yellow) and sun (red).

Queensland Police Service

Medals 

Queensland Police Valour Medal – Awarded to an officer who performs an act of exceptional bravery in hazardous circumstances (established 1993).
Queensland Police Bravery Medal – Awarded to an officer who performs an act of bravery in hazardous circumstances.
 Commissioner's Certificate for Bravery – Awarded to an officer who performs an act of bravery in hazardous circumstances.
 Queensland Police Meritorious Service Medal – Awarded to a member who provides a continued substantial contribution in a specified category over an extended period of time.  The ribbon colours are pale blue, with stripes of medium blue, and white.
 Queensland Police Exemplary Conduct Medal – Awarded to a member who is recognised for exemplary conduct in a specific role or duty which enhances the professional image of the Service far exceeding what might be reasonably expected from an efficient member of the Service.  The ribbon colours are maroon, black, and white, and may have various clasps.
Queensland Police Service Medal – Awarded to an officer for 10 years service, a clasp is awarded for another 5-year (equating to 15 years service). The clasp is replaced every 5 years there after to read the total number of years service represented by the medal.

Citations 

QPS 150 Years Citation – Serving during the 150th year of the Queensland Police Service (2014).  The frame has 'Queensland Police' at the top and '1864 - 2014' at the bottom.

Queensland Corrective Services 

 Queensland Corrective Service Officer's Long Service Medal – For 10 years service

Queensland Ambulance Service 

 Queensland Ambulance Service Distinguished Service Medal – Awarded to officers of the QAS to recognise conspicuous service and humane and brave acts.
 Commissioner's Meritorious Service Award – Awarded at the discretion of the Commissioner in recognition of any member who performs commendable service in a designated role or function to an exceptional level over an extended period of time.
 Queensland Ambulance Service Long Service Medal – Awarded to uniformed paramedics and emergency medical dispatchers for 10 years service, with a clasp awarded for each subsequent period of 10 years served.
 Commissioner's Commendation – For outstanding performance in any endeavour not attracting another award, but which deserves recognition.
 Assistant Commissioner's Commendation – For recognition of noteworthy performance in any endeavour at the Assistant Commissioner's discretion.
 Commissioner's Certificate of Appreciation – Appreciation in recognition of substantial donations to the QAS or for continued valuable assistance over the years
 Assistant Commissioner's Certificate of Appreciation – For use at the Assistant Commissioner's discretion.

Queensland Fire and Emergency Service 

 Commissioner's Medal for Valour – For exceptional bravery in hazardous circumstances where there has been a clear and significant threat to life.
 Commissioner's Distinguished Service Medal – For Distinguished service or Outstanding actions in relation to fire service duties, administrative leadership or distinguished performance of a specific or difficult project or task, not involving bravery.
 Commissioner's Commendation for Bravery – For bravery in hazardous circumstances.
 Commissioner's Meritorious Service Award – For a member who performs outstanding service.
 Commissioner's Commendation of Notable Action – For being placed in a potentially hazardous situation beyond that of normal requirement.
 Diligent and Ethical Service Medal (No longer awarded) – Awarded to uniformed Fire Officers and Fire Communications Dispatch Officers for 10 years service, with a clasp awarded for each subsequent period of 10 years served.
 Queensland Fire and Emergency Services Medal – Awarded to uniformed Fire Officers and Fire Communications Dispatch Officers for 10 years service, with a clasp awarded for each subsequent period of 10 years served.
 Certificate of Commendation – For specific meritorious or outstanding actions in relation to fire service duties or exemplary performance in a specific difficult or long term project or task.
 Certificate of Appreciation – For assistance provided to fire service duties or exemplary performance in a specific project or task.
 Commissioner's Unit Citation – For outstanding action by a group or unit in exceptional circumstances
 Deputy Commissioner's Unit Citation – Above and beyond the expectations of their role
 Assistant Commissioner's Unit Citation – Above and beyond the expectations of their role

State Emergency Service 

 Meritorious Service Medal – Awarded to a member for 10 years service, a clasp is awarded for another 5-year (equating to 15 years service). The clasp is replaced every 5 years there after to read the total number of years service represented by the medal.
 Queensland Fire and Emergency Services Medal – Awarded to a member for 10 years service, a clasp is awarded for another 5-year (equating to 15 years service). The clasp is replaced every 5 years there after to read the total number of years service represented by the medal.
 The Queensland State Emergency Service (SES) Life Member Award (LMA) recognise SES volunteer members who have given a strong, outstanding individual commitment and special contribution to the service.
 SES Week Awards - State Awards consist of The Minister's Cup; The Commissioner's Cup; The Assistant Commissioner's Shield; and The Joyce Scorey Shield.
 SES Week Awards - Regional Awards consist of the SES Regional Member of the Year; the SES Regional Unit/Group of the Year; Operational Response of the Year; the SES Regional Trainer of the Year; and Regional SES Week Awards for individuals.  Each QFES region will issue these awards.

Special honours 

 Naming of New Appliances – Distinguished service by members of the QFRS may be recognised by having new fire appliances named after them.

See also 

 New South Wales Honours

References

Queensland Ambulance Service medals
Queensland Fire and Rescue Service medals
Queensland Fire and Emergency Services Honours and Awards

Civil awards and decorations of Australia
Society in Queensland